The Pratt & Whitney T34 (company designation PT2 Turbo-Wasp) was an American axial flow turboprop engine designed and built by Pratt & Whitney. Its only major application was on the Douglas C-133 Cargomaster.

Design and development

In 1945, the United States Navy funded the development of a turboprop engine. The T34 was produced from 1951 to 1960, but never used in U.S. Navy aircraft production.

The YT34 engine with three wide-bladed propellers was made for two Navy Lockheed R7V-2 Constellation (C-121s) variants, for testing. Flight tests were on 1 September 1954.

In September 1950, a testbed Boeing B-17 Flying Fortress flew with a T34 turboprop mounted in the nose of the bomber. The first application for the T34 was the Boeing YC-97J Stratofreighter, which later became the Aero Spacelines Super Guppy. The next application for the engine was the Douglas C-133 Cargomaster.

Variants

T34-P-1 equivalent.
T34-P-2 Similar to -1.
T34-P-3 equivalent.
YT34-P-5 equivalent
T34-P-6 equivalent
T34-P-7
T34-P-7W equivalent, w/water injection 
T34-P-9W equivalent, w/water injection
T34-P-12
YT34-P-12A equivalent
PT2F-1 equivalent, unbuilt civilian version planned to power the Lockheed L-1249B.
PT2G-3 equivalent, unbuilt civilian version planned to power the Lockheed L-1449 and possibly the L-1549.

Applications

 Aero Spacelines Super Guppy
 Boeing YC-97J Stratofreighter (YT34-P-5)
 Douglas YC-124B Globemaster II
 Douglas C-133 Cargomaster
 Lockheed R7V-2 Constellation (YT34-P-12A)
 Lockheed YC-121F Constellation (T34-P-6)

Engines on display
 T34-P-3: National Air and Space Museum (NASM) in Washington, D.C.
 T34-P-6: Travis Air Force Base Heritage Center in Fairfield, California
 T34-P-7W: NASM
 T34-P-7WA: Pacific Coast Air Museum (PCAM) in Santa Rosa, California

Specifications (T34-P-3)

See also

References

External links

 Pratt & Whitney's T34 page
 Pratt & Whitney T34 page on Shanaberger.com

1950s turboprop engines
T34